This is a list of Bishops of Făgăraș and Alba Iulia, who are the Primates of Romanian Greek Catholic Church.

Bishop of Alba Iulia
 Atanasie Anghel (1698–1713)
 vacant (1713–1715)

Bishops of Făgăraș and Alba Iulia
 Ioan Giurgiu Patachi (1715–1727)
 Ioan  Micu-Klein (1728–1751)
 Petru Pavel Aron (1752–1764)
 Atanasie Rednic (1765–1772)
 Grigore Maior (1772–1782)
 Ioan Bob (1783–1830)
 vacant (1830–1832)
 Ioan Lemeni (1832–1850)

Archbishops and Metropolitans of Făgăraș and Alba Iulia
 Alexandru Sterca-Șuluțiu (1850–1867)
 Ioan Vancea (1868–1892)
 Victor Mihaly de Apşa (1893–1918)
 vacant (1918–1920)
 Vasile Suciu (1920–1935)
 Alexandru Nicolescu (1935–1941)
 Valeriu Traian Frențiu (1941–1946) (Apostolic Administrator)
 Ioan Suciu (1946–1948) (Apostolic Administrator)
 vacant (1948–1990, the church was declared illegal by the Communist regime)
 Alexandru Todea (1990–1994)
 Lucian Mureșan (1994–2005) (elevated as Major Archbishop and Metropolitan in 2005)

Major Archbishops and Metropolitans of Făgăraș and Alba Iulia
 Lucian Mureșan (2005–Present) (previously, Archbishop and Metropolitan, 1994-2005)

See also
 Romanian Catholic Major Archdiocese of Făgăraș and Alba Iulia

Sources
 Religious Leaders

Fagaras and Alba Julia
Fagaras
Bishops
Eastern Catholicism-related lists
Eastern Catholic bishops in Europe